Over It All is a studio album from Australian worship band Planetshakers. Planetshakers Ministries International and Venture3Media released the album on 6 November 2020. The album was recorded at Planetshakers Studios at Melbourne, Australia, under one of the most extreme and crippling quarantine measures in the world due to COVID-19.
They worked with Joth Hunt, in the production of this album.

Critical reception
Randy Cross from Worship Leader says, Incredibly balanced. Perfectly Planetshakers. Over It All releases a cavalcade of praise and worship with a little something stylistically for everyone. Very reminiscent of some of the "dance club" contemporary Christian music of the 90s, which is not necessarily a bad thing, just something that not every listener may enjoy.

Track listing

Chart performance

Personnel
Adapted from AllMusic. 

 Planetshakers – Primary artist
 Joth Hunt – Artwork, Composer, Design, Guitar, Keyboards, Mixing, Producer, Programming, Project Coordinator, Video Director, Vocals
 Samantha Evans – Composer, Editing, Executive Producer, Vocals
 Rudy Nikkerud – Vocals
 Chelsi Nikkerud – Vocals
 Andy Harrison – Composer, Drums, Vocals
 Natalie Ruiz – Vocals
 Brian "Bj" Pridham – Composer
 Noah Walker – Composer
 Jennifer Bourke – Project Coordinator
 Joshua Brown – A&R
 Joe Carra – Mastering
 Christel Chia – Editing
 Daryl – 	Artwork, Design, Editing
 Vian Cronje – Artwork, Design
 Micaela Elliott – Editing
 Russell Evans	– Executive Producer

References

2020 albums
Planetshakers albums
Christian music albums by Australian artists